The 2021 NBL Cup was the first edition of the NBL Cup, organised by the Australian National Basketball League (NBL). The cup was played from 20 February 2021 until 14 March 2021. All 36 games were played at John Cain Arena and the State Basketball Centre in Melbourne, Victoria. 

Perth Wildcats won the inaugural NBL Cup trophy with a 7–1 record.

Venues 
The tournament was played at two venues in Melbourne.

Teams

Personnel and sponsorship

Games

Round 1

Day 1

Day 2

Day 3

Day 4

Round 2

Day 5

Day 6

Day 7

Day 8

Round 3

Day 9

Day 10

Day 11

Day 12

Day 13

Round 4

Day 14

Day 15

Day 16

Day 17

Day 18

Ladder

References

External links

 Cup
Australia,NBL Cup
2020–21 in Australian basketball
2021 in New Zealand basketball